The Texas LNG project is a multi-decade liquid natural gas shipping terminal project near Brownsville, Texas.  It has been in the planning stages since the early 2010s and, as of 2019, gained regulatory authority approval for construction and operation in the 2020s, with initial export shipments as early as 2025.  The facility is intended to enable US natural gas that is in good supply in the US to be efficiently stored and shipped to the global market in an efficient (liquified) form.

The Texas LNG LLC company of Houston, Texas completed environmental review and received a permit from the Federal Energy Regulatory Commission (FERC) in 2019.  The company is expected to make the final investment decision on the project no earlier than 2021, and start construction on the project as early as 2022.

Description 

The project is intended, when fully built out circa 2030, to process up to 4 million tonnes of natural gas annually. Phase 1 of the project will process just half that, and could be operational as early as 2025.

History 

The United States has had a massive shift in LNG terminal planning and construction starting in 2010-2011 due to a rapid increase in US domestic natural gas supply with the widespread adoption of hydraulic fracking petroleum recovery technology. Many new LNG import terminals are planning or have begun addition of liquefaction facilities to operate as export terminals.

Texas LNG LLC obtained the project site at the Port of Brownsville in 2013 (on the north side of the Brownsville Ship Channel), and completed conceptual design and preliminary engineering in 2014.  The front-end engineering and design (FEED) study for the project was completed by Samsung Engineering in 2016.

The final environmental impact statement was approved by the Federal Energy Regulatory Commission (FERC) in March 2019. On 21 November 2019, U.S. regulators approved the permit for Texas LNG LLC to build the facility, following an extensive environmental review. The specific approval was to build and operate the Texas LNG Brownsville LLC plant and shipping terminal at the Port of Brownsville. 

One month after approval, the Sierra Club and other environmental groups asked the FERC to reconsider the permits, saying the agency failed to adequately consider environmental impacts.

, the Texas LLC company was expected to make the final investment decision on the project no earlier than 2021, and start construction on the project as early as 2022, with the first phase of the project ready for commissioning by 2025.

References 

Liquefied natural gas terminals
Energy infrastructure in Texas